Vasudeva-hindi (IAST: Vasudevahiṇḍī, "Vasudeva's wanderings") is a Jain text by Sangha-dasa, probably from 5th century India. The text narrates several stories in the form of nested narrative layers. The main story is borrowed from Gunadhya's Brihat-katha, with the original hero Nara-vahana-datta replaced by Krishna's father Vasudeva.

Authorship and date 

Vasudeva-hindi is the oldest surviving text of the Jain narrative literature. The Jain monk Sangha-dasa wrote it in archaic Maharashtri Prakrit language. The author claims that the legend of Vasudeva was first told by Mahavira's pupil Sudharman to his disciple Jambu, and since then, the story was transmitted to the author through a series of teachers and disciples.

The text was definitely composed before 610 CE, when Jina-bhadra-gani Kshama-shramana refers to it in his Visheshana Vati. The author dates the text to the year 530 of an unspecified calendar era. Scholars K.R. Chandra and M.A. Dhaky believe that the era is the Vikrama Samvat, and thus, date the text to 473 CE. Indologist J.C. Jain writes that the date of Vasudeva-hindi has been "fixed" as the end of the 3rd century, but Indologist John E. Cort notes that there is no scholarly consensus on this, and Jain authors tend to date their texts as early as possible. U.P. Shah dates the text to early 5th century or a little earlier, while M.N.P. Tiwari dates it to mid-6th century.

Some parts of the text, such as Dhammilla-hindi, are a later addition to the original text.

The second layer of the frame story in the text names Mahavira as a narrator, which is a way of legitimizing the story as true. The naming of a king (instead of a Jain disciple) as the listener suggests that the text was aimed at an urban audience rather than monks.

Contents 

The text narrates the legend of Krishna's father Vasudeva. It is in form of multiple narrative layers, featuring several characters and stories from different times and places. The main story is borrowed from Gunadhya's Brihat-katha tradition, in which the hero is Nara-vahana-datta instead of Vasudeva. The text also includes materials from Vaishnavite texts such as Harivamsa and Vishnu Purana. The author quotes long passages from Jain canonical texts such as Samavayanga Sutra and Sthananga Sutra.

The text progresses to the main story as follows:

Layer 4 contains the main story of Vasudeva's adventures, which is interspersed with secondary stories that talk about the Jain faith and its 63 illustrous persons. The narrative layers containing these secondary stories go still deeper. For example, in one of the narrative layers, Vasudeva refuses to marry the grand-daughter of an old woman because of her low social status. The old woman then talks about the origins of her family, narrating the story of her ancestor Usabha.

The narrative then goes back to the main story as follows:

Unlike other texts, such as the Mahabharata, Vasudeva-hindi does not remind the reader of the main frame story or any sub-frame story at any point. According to scholar Anna Aurelia Esposito, Vasudeva-hindi deliberately confuses the readers with such complex layers to cause them to "experience the sensation to be completely lost – lost not only in this thicket of stories, but also in the complex and incomprehensible nature of the world."

References

Further reading

External links 
 Vasudeva-hindi text in Devanagari script
 Dharmasenagani Mahattara's Vasudevahimdi Madhyama Khanda Part 1

Jain literature
5th-century books
Frame stories